is a 1997 Japanese movie directed by Takahisa Zeze about three girls, Mio, Hiroko, and Masami.

Plot
A group of friends play the Japanese game Kokkuri to summon Kokkuri-san, a spirit who can answer any question as a pastime but apparently reveals dark secrets that will make these girls turn against each other.

Cast & Crew 

Screenplay by:
Rikiya Mizushima
Isao Kiriyama

Executive Producers:
Tomozo Yamaguchi
Tatsuo Uruga 

Producer:
Kazuyuki Kobayashi
Minoru Yokote 
Shigehiro Arake 

Screenplay:
Takahisa Zeze
Kishu Izuchi 

Director:
Takahisa Zeze

Lighting:
Shinichi Hayashi 

Supervising Production Designer:
Yoshinobu Nishioka

Art Director:
Hisayuki Kobayashi 

Music:
Goro Yasukawa 
Sound Director:
Atsushi Sugiyama 

Editing:
Shinichi Fushima

Cast:
Ayumi Yamatsu 
Hiroko Shimada 
Moe Ishikawa

Release
It was distributed in the United States of America by AsiaVision, the Asian live action label of Urban Vision Entertainment.

References

External links
 AsiaVision Official Website
 Kokkuri-san review at SaruDama.com
 

1997 films
1990s Japanese-language films
Films directed by Takahisa Zeze
1997 horror films
1990s Japanese films